Nandi Veendum Varika is a 1986 Indian Malayalam comedy film produced by M. Sunil Kumar under SS Movie Production, directed by P. G. Viswambharan and written jointly by Jagadish and Sreenivasan. It features an ensemble cast of Mammootty, Suresh Gopi, Urvashi, M. G. Soman and Sreenivasan in the lead roles. The cinematography was handled by Vipin Mohan. The film features original songs and score composed by Shyam.

The film revolves around Mohandas C. K. (Mammootty), a teacher who on being forced by his father (Sankaradi) joins the police force as a Sub-inspector. However, he is reluctant to become a police officer as he is scared and cowardly in nature. He gets his first posting in an village were corruption is rampant. The plot explores how he overcomes his cowardly nature and brings the corrupt Ananthan Nair (M. G. Soman) to justice.

The film was shot extensively in and around Ottasekharamangalam in Thiruvananthapuram district. Principal photography was done in 1-1.5 months. The film was released on 12 September 1986 on the occasion of Onam and was a commercial failure. The film was among the few commercially unsuccessful films in which Mammootty had starred in that year. However, the film has over the years acquired a cult following. The film was later remade into Tamil as Kavalukku Kettikaran.

Plot 
Mohandas is the son of Chathukutty, a police constable, who dreams of making him a sub-inspector of police. Mohandas, however, is happy as a teacher in a tutorial college, and does not wish to take up the job as he is a coward by nature. He tries to fail the written exam for SI selection, but his father uses his influence to get him selected and then emotionally blackmails him to join. After finishing his training, he joins a police station in a village where Ananthan Nair is a de facto king. Ananthan Nair owns all the big businesses and is a close friend of the police big wigs, with whose help he indulges in a number of nefarious activities including bootlegging. He also exploits the poor farmers in the region. When Balan opposes his actions, he gets Balan beaten up by his goons, and rapes Balan's wife, who subsequently commits suicide. When Mohandas arrives to take charge at the local police station, he initially sides with Ananthan Nair due to his cowardice. With the help of Damodaran, another school teacher, he overcomes his fear and proceeds to help the population and take action against Ananthan Nair.

Cast
Mammootty as Mohandas C. K.
Suresh Gopi as Balan
Urvashi as Devayani
M. G. Soman as Ananthan Nair
Sreenivasan as Damodharan
Sankaradi as Chathukutty
Sukumari as Madhavi
Adoor Bhasi as Vishnu Nampoothiri
Kuthiravattam Pappu as Mukundan
Poojappura Ravi as Mathachan
Jagannatha Varma 
Jagadish
Thodupuzha Vasanthi as Ananthan Nair's wife 
K. P. A. C. Azeez as Right hand of Ananthan Nair
Uma Bharani as Balan's wife

Soundtrack
The music was composed by Shyam and the lyrics were written by Chunakkara Ramankutty.

Reception
The film was a commercial failure.

References

External links
 

1986 films
1980s Malayalam-language films
Films directed by P. G. Viswambharan
Malayalam films remade in other languages